Marge Kotlisky (February 19, 1927 - December 2, 1997) was an American actress.  She died in 1997 of cancer.

Filmography
My Bodyguard (1980)
Thief (1981)
Sixteen Candles (1984)
Sable (unknown episodes, 1987)
Major League (1989)
Johnny Ryan (1990) (TV Movie)
The Kid Who Loved Christmas (1990) (TV Movie)
L.A. Law (1 episode, 1991)
Homicide (1991)
The Public Eye (1992)
Getting Up and Going Home (1992) (TV Movie)
The Fresh Prince of Bel-Air (1 episode, 1992)
Missing Persons (1 episode, 1993)
Early Edition (1 episode, 1997)
The Con (1998) (TV Movie)

References

External links

1927 births
1997 deaths
20th-century American actresses
Actresses from Chicago
American film actresses
American television actresses
Deaths from cancer in Illinois